This is an incomplete alphabetical list of the Georgian people active in the short-lived Democratic Republic of Georgia (DRG), 1918-1921.

A 
 Aslan-Beg Abashidze, general
 Shalva Abdushelishvili, Member of Parliament from the Social Democratic Party
 Kote Abkhazi, general
 Stepane Akhmeteli, general
 Iason Akhvlediani, general 
 Shalva Aleksi-Meskhishvili
 Ambrosi, Catholicos Patriarch of All Georgia
 Alexander Andronikashvili, general
 Spiridon Andronikashvili, general
 Giorgi Arjevanidze, general 
 David Artmeladze, general  
 Razhden Arsenidze, Social Democrat, Minister of Justice
 Sosipatre Asatiani, Social Democrat, Chairman of Georgian Legation in Paris  
 Zurab Avalishvili, historian, diplomatist

B 
 Zakaria Bakradze, general
 Andria Benashvili, general

C 

 Alexandre Chkheidze, colonel, later Major General in the Polish service
 Nikolay Chkheidze, former President of the Transcaucasian Sejm, President of the Georgian delegation for the Peace conference in Paris, President of the Constitutional Assembly of Georgia
 Akaki Chkhenkeli, former President of Transcaucasian government, Minister of Foreign Affairs of Georgia
 Benia Chkhikvishvili, Social Democrat, former President of Gurian Republic, Mayor of Tbilisi, shot by the Bolsheviks in 1924
 Parmen Chichinadze, politician, Minister of War
 Kakutsa Cholokashvili, colonel, National Hero of Georgia

D 

 Ioseb Dadiani, MP from the National Democratic Party
 Seit Devdariani, MP from the Social Democratic Party

E 

 Giorgi Eradze, Social Democrat, Minister of Labour

G 

 Revaz Gabashvili, author, MP from the National Democratic Party
 Konstantine Gamsakhurdia, writer, diplomatist
 Nestor Gardapkhadze, general
 Ioseb Gedevanishvili (ka), general, Social Federalist Party
 Evgeni Gegechkori, former President of the Transcaucasian government, Minister of Foreigne Affairs of Georgia
 David Ghambashidze, mining engineer, diplomat, author.
 Grigol Giorgadze, Social Democrat, Minister of the War
 Ivane Gomarteli, Social Democrat politician
 Vladimir Goguadze,  Social Democrat, National Guard officer
 Elizbar Gulisashvili, colonel
 Giorgi Gvazava, MP from the National Democratic Party

J 

 Iason Javakhishvili, MP from the National Democratic Party
 Ivane Javakhishvili, historian, MP
 Artem Jijikhia, general
 Valiko Jugheli, Social Democrat, Head of National Guard, shot by the Bolsheviks in 1924
 Giorgi Juruli, National Democrat, Minister of Finance, Trade and Industry

K 

 Konstantine Kandelaki, Social Democrat, minister of Finance
 Parnaoz Karalashvili, colonel
 Meliton Kartsivadze, MP from the Social Democratic Party
 Kale Kavtaradze, MP from the Social Democratic Party
 Giorgi Kazbegi, retired general and public figure
 Ivane Kazbegi, general
 Spiridon Kedia, MP from National Democrat Party
 Leo Kereselidze, general
 Giorgi Khimshiashvili, colonel 
 Noe Khomeriki, Social Democrat, Minister of Agriculture, shot by the Bolsheviks in 1924
 Akaki Khoshtaria, oil magnate 
 Giorgi Kvinitadze, general

L 
 Giorgi Laskhishvili, Social Federalist, Minister of Education
 Alexandre Lomtatitdze, MP from the Social Democratic Party
 Ivane Lordkipanidze, National Democrat, minister of Railways

M 

 Shalva Meskhishvili, Social Federalist, minister of Justice
 Shalva Maglakelidze, colonel
 Abel Makashvili, general
 Giorgi Mazniashvili, general
 Vlasa Mgeladze, MP of Social Democratic Party 
 Rostom Muskhelishvili, colonel

N 

 Levan Natadze, MP from the Social Democratic Party
 Niko Nikoladze,  journalist, Honorary Chairman of the National Democratic Party

P 
 Samson Pirtskhalava, MP from the Social Federalist Party, vice-president of Constitutional Assembly

R 

 Grigol Robakidze, writer, diplomat
 Noe Ramishvili, first head of government, Minister of Interior

S 

 Datiko Sharashidze, MP for the Social Democratic Party
 Kristine Sharashidze, MP from the Social Democratic Party
 Peri-Khan Sofieva, MP from Socialist-Federalist Revolutionary Party and first female elected deputy in Muslim history
 Petre Surguladze, politician from the National Democratic Party

T 

 Ekvtime Takaishvili, historian, MP from the National Democratic Party, vice-president of Constitutional Assembly
 Victor Tevzaia, Social Democrat, ambassador to Ukraine 
 Alexandre Tsereteli, MP from the Social Federalist Party
 Erekle Tsereteli, colonel
 Irakli Tsereteli,  Social Democrat, plenipotentiary Minister, vice-president of Georgian delegation to Peace conference in Paris
 Mikheil Tsereteli, politician, former anarchist 
 Svimon Tsereteli, colonel
 Vasil Tsereteli, MP from the National Democratic Party
 Grigol Tsintsadze, captain, 1924 uprising
 Noe Tsintsadze, Social Democrat, Minister of Youth
 Varden Tsulukidze, general

U 

 Grigol Uratadze, Social Democrat, Foreign Affairs Secretary

V 

 David Vachnadze, colonel, MP from the National Democratic Party

Z 

 Solomon Zaldastanishvili, colonel
 Noe Zhordania, speaker of National Council of Georgia, chairman of the second and third governments
 Ivane Zourabichvili, National Democrat.

Footnotes

See also 

Georgian emigration in Poland

 
Democratic Republic of Georgia
Georgia
Democratic Republic of Georgia
Georgia